Miss Evelyne (German:Miss Evelyne, die Badefee) is a 1929 German silent film directed by Norman Dix and starring Pilar Munza, Marietta Manetti and Karl Peukert.

Cast
 Pilar Munza as Miss Evelyne Dollar aus New York / Ingeborg erk, englische Korrespondentin der Fa. Bluff & Co
 Marietta Manetti as Ruth Corrin Gesellschafterin bei Miss Evelyne
 Karl Peukert as Dr. med. Freytag
 Ernst Netrük as Assessor Winnhuber 
 Bobby Todd as Ritter Karlheinz von u. zu Daxl
 August Junker as René Bombast 
 Adolf Satzenhofer as Fred Spencer
 Adolf Böckl as Aloisius Meier aus München

References

External links

1929 films
Films of the Weimar Republic
German silent feature films
German black-and-white films